The 2011 Jeff Byrd 500 presented by Food City was a NASCAR Sprint Cup Series stock car race that was held on March 20, 2011, at Bristol Motor Speedway in Bristol, Tennessee. Contested over 500 laps, it was the fourth race of the 2011 NASCAR Sprint Cup Series. The race was won by Kyle Busch, for the Joe Gibbs Racing team. Carl Edwards finished second, and Jimmie Johnson clinched third.

There were ten cautions and 17 lead changes among eight different drivers throughout the course of the race. It was Busch's first win of the 2011 season, and the 20th of his career.

Report

Background

As a tribute to the late president of the Speedway who died in 2010, longtime race title sponsor K-VA-T Food City, which celebrated the 20th year of race sponsorship in 2011 (as of 2013, the longest continuous sponsorship deal in NASCAR for a race), named the race in his memory, henceforth the Jeff Byrd 500 presented by Food City.

The track, Bristol Motor Speedway, is one of five short tracks to hold NASCAR races, the others being Richmond International Raceway, Dover International Speedway, Martinsville Speedway, and Phoenix International Raceway. The track's turns are banked from twenty-four to thirty degrees, while the front stretch, the location of the finish line, is banked from six to ten degrees. The back stretch also has banking from six to ten degrees.

Before the race, Tony Stewart was leading the Drivers' Championship with 113 points, tied with Kyle Busch in second. Carl Edwards and Juan Pablo Montoya followed in third and fourth with 106 points, three ahead of Ryan Newman and ten ahead of Paul Menard in fifth and sixth. Martin Truex Jr. in seventh had 95, the same number of points as Denny Hamlin in eighth. They were one point ahead of A. J. Allmendinger in ninth, while Dale Earnhardt Jr. was tenth with 91. In the Manufacturers' Championship, Ford was leading with 21 points, three ahead of Toyota in second. Chevrolet was placed in third with 16 points, while Dodge followed with 11. Jimmie Johnson was the race's defending winner from 2010.

Practice and qualifying
Three practice sessions were held before the race; the first on Friday, which lasted 90 minutes. The second and third were both on Saturday afternoon, and lasted 45 minutes each. Edwards was quickest with a time of 14.912 seconds in the first session, 0.076 seconds faster than Johnson. Greg Biffle was just off Johnson's pace, followed by Kasey Kahne, Menard, and David Ragan. Kyle Busch was seventh, still within a second of Edwards' time.

Forty-four cars were entered for qualifying, but only forty-three could qualify for the race because of NASCAR's qualifying procedure. Edwards clinched the 9th pole position of his career, with a time of 14.989 seconds. He was joined on the front row of the grid by Biffle. Regan Smith qualified third, Menard took fourth, and Ragan started fifth. Johnson, Jeff Gordon, Truex, Mark Martin and Kahne rounded out the top ten. The driver that failed to qualify for the race was Ken Schrader. Once the qualifying session concluded, Edwards stated, "I'm enjoying this. I'm having fun. I'm hoping it lasts, and I'm going to keep driving the way I'm driving until we win a championship, or this car won't go as fast."

In the second practice session, Stewart was fastest with a time of 15.364 seconds, more than six hundredths of a second quicker than second-placed Reutimann. Martin took third place, ahead of Jamie McMurray, Kurt Busch and Jeff Burton. In the third and final practice, Martin was quickest with a time of 15.472 seconds. Brian Vickers followed in second, ahead of Hamlin and Joey Logano. Stewart, who was first in the second practice, was fifth quickest, with a time of 15.570 seconds. Montoya, Gordon, Truex, Menard, and Kurt Busch rounded out the first ten positions.

Race

The race, the fourth of the season, began at 1:00 p.m. EDT and was televised live in the United States on Fox. Mike Rife, reverend of the Vansant Church of Christ, began pre-race ceremonies with the invocation. Actor and country music singer Billy Ray Cyrus performed the national anthem, while Claudia Byrd, Christian Byrd and Belton Caldwell gave the command for drivers to start their engines.

Results

Qualifying

Race results

Standings after the race

Note: Only the top five positions are included for the driver standings.

References

Jeff Byrd 500
Jeff Byrd 500
NASCAR races at Bristol Motor Speedway
March 2011 sports events in the United States